IGRA or Igra may refer to:
Indian Gaming Regulatory Act, a law governing Native American (Indian) gambling industries
Interferon gamma release assay, a lab test used in tuberculosis diagnosis
International Gay Rodeo Association, a sanctioning body for gay rodeos
Igra, a rural locality (a settlement) in the Udmurt Republic, Russia
Integrated Global Radiosonde Archive, collecting worldwide radiosonde observations.
Meshullam Igra (–1801), Galician rabbi